Série 2550 were the second batch of 25 kV electric locomotives built for Portuguese Railways (CP). They entered service in 1964 and were used on the main line between Lisbon and Oporto. 20 locomotives were built; as of 2012 none remain in service. Unlike the earlier Série 2500, the Série 2550 were built with unpainted stainless steel bodywork. They were constructed by Sorefame, with components from the French company Alsthom.

The Série 4700 were built in 2007-2009 as a replacement for the Série 2550.

References
 

Electric locomotives of Portugal
Railway locomotives introduced in 1963
Bo′Bo′ locomotives
Alstom locomotives
5 ft 6 in gauge locomotives